The 2015 Atlantic 10 Conference baseball tournament took place from May 20 through 23.  The top seven regular season finishers of the league's twelve teams met in the double-elimination tournament held at Barcroft Park, the home field of George Washington in Arlington, Virginia.  VCU won their first title as a member of the conference to earn the conference's automatic bid to the 2015 NCAA Division I baseball tournament.

Seeding and format
The tournament used the same format adopted in 2014, with the top seven finishers from the regular season seeded one through seven.  The top seed, Saint Louis, received a single bye while remaining seeds played on the first day.

Results

All-Tournament Team
The following players were named to the All-Tournament Team.

Most Outstanding Player
Darian Carpenter was named Tournament Most Valuable Player.  Carpenter was a first baseman for VCU.

References

Tournament
Atlantic 10 Conference Baseball Tournament
Atlantic 10 Conference baseball tournament
Atlantic 10 Conference baseball tournament
Baseball in Virginia
College sports in Virginia
Sports competitions in Virginia
Sports in the Washington metropolitan area
Tourist attractions in Arlington County, Virginia